Araks, known as Nerkin Karkhun and Sharifabad until 1946, is a village in the eastern part of the Armavir Province of Armenia, specifically in the Araks Municipality.

References 

World Gazeteer: Armenia – World-Gazetteer.com

Populated places in Armavir Province
Yazidi populated places in Armenia